Nationality words link to articles with information on the nation's poetry or literature (for instance, Irish or France).

Events
June 30 - Convicted assassin Charles Guiteau writes a poem called "I am Going to the Lordy", which he recites immediately before his execution the same day

Works published

United Kingdom

 William Allingham, Evil May-Day
 F. J. Child, ed., The English and Scottish Popular Ballads, in 5 volumes (1882–98), including multiple versions of 305 ballads, American scholar published in England
 Toru Dutt, Ancient Ballads and Legends of Hidnustan, London: Kegan Paul, Trench, Trubner and Co. (fifth edition, 1927; reprinted several times by various publishers since then); Indian poet, writing in English, published in the United Kingdom
 William Livingston (Uilleam Macdhunleibhe, died 1870), Duain agus Orain, Scottish Gaelic poet published in Scotland
George Robert Sims, The Dagonet Ballads
 Algernon Charles Swinburne, Tristram of Lyonesse, and Other Poems

Great scientist this year a published poet
James Clerk Maxwell (1831–1879), whose contributions to science were profound (including formulation of Maxwell's equations which for the first time expressed the basic laws of electricity and magnetism in a unified fashion, and other discoveries that helped usher in modern physics), this year became a published poet when a collection of his poems was published by his friend Lewis Campbell, two years after Maxwell's death.

As a great lover of British poetry, Maxwell memorized poems and wrote his own. The best known is Rigid Body Sings closely based on Comin' Through the Rye by Robert Burns, which he apparently used to sing while accompanying himself on a guitar. It has the immortal opening lines :

Gin a body meet a body
Flyin' through the air.
Gin a body hit a body,
Will it fly? And where?

(Maxwell is also known for creating the first true-colour photograph in 1861.)

United States
 Amos Bronson Alcott, Sonnets and Canzonets
 Thomas Bailey Aldrich, Poems
 George Henry Boker, The Book of the Dead
 Hjalmar Hjorth Boyesen, Idyls of Norway
 Paul Hamilton Hayne, Collected Poems
 Emma Lazarus, Songs of a Semite
 Henry Wadsworth Longfellow, In the Harbor: Ultima Thule, Part II
 William Gilmore Simms (died 1870), Works, 10 volumes, including poetry, New York
 Mary Ashley Townsend, Down the Bayou and Other Poems

Other
 Gabriele D'Annunzio, Canto novo, Italy
 Octave Crémazie (died 1879), Œuvres complètes, Canada
 Toru Dutt (died 1877), Ancient Ballads and Legends of Hidnustan, London: Kegan Paul, Trench, Trubner and Co. (fifth edition, 1927; reprinted several times since by various publishers), Indian poet, writing in English, published in the United Kingdom
 Kalidasa, Sakuntalam translated from the original Sanskrit into Malayalam by Kerala Varma Valiya Koil Thampuran, India
 Friedrich Nietzsche, The Gay Science (Die fröhliche Wissenschaft), Germany, a study embracing poetry, philosophy and the author's "God is dead" view
 Jacques Perk (died 1881), Mathilde, Netherlands
 Friedrich Theodor Vischer, Lyrische Gänge ("Lyrical passages"), Germany
 Iosif Vulcan, Lira mea ("My Lyre"), Romanian, published in Austria-Hungary

Awards and honors

Births
Death years link to the corresponding "[year] in poetry" article:
 January 15 – Jun Kawada 川田 順 (died 1966), Japanese, Shōwa period tanka poet and entrepreneur
 January 18 – A. A. Milne (died 1956), English author, playwright and writer of children's poetry best known for his books about the teddy bear, Winnie-the-Pooh, and for various children's poems
 February 2 – James Joyce (died 1941), Irish writer and poet, widely considered to be one of the most influential writers of the twentieth century
 February 4 – E. J. Pratt (died 1964), Canadian poet
 February 6 – Anne Spencer (died 1975), American Black poet and active participant in the New Negro Movement
 February 9 – James Stephens (died 1950), Irish novelist and poet (said he was born on this date; some think it may have been two years earlier (1880))
 February 10 – Winifred Mary Letts (died 1972), English writer
 March 24 – Enid Derham (died 1941), Australian poet and academic
 May 5 – Kyōsuke Kindaichi 金田一 京助 (died 1971), Japanese linguist and poet, father of linguist Haruhiko Kindaichi
 May 14 – Mokichi Saitō (died 1953), Japanese, Taishō period poet of the Araragi school and psychiatrist, father of novelist Kita Morio
 June 1 – John Drinkwater (died 1937), English poet and dramatist
 June 5 – Seemab Akbarabadi سیماب اکبرآبادی, born Aashiq Hussain Siddiqui (died 1951), Urdu poet from India
 July 13 – Catherine Pozzi (died 1934), French poet and woman of letters
 July 22 – Frederic Manning (died 1935), Australian poet and novelist
 September 17 – Darrell Figgis (suicide 1925), Irish poet and nationalist
 September 23 – Brian Vrepont (died 1955), Australian
 October 2 – Martin Armstrong (died 1974), English writer and poet
 November 26 – Ikuma Arishima, 有島生馬 pen-name (together with Utosei and then Jugatsutei) of Arishima Mibuma (died 1974), Japanese novelist, poet and painter; member of the Shirakaba literary circle
 December 3 – Santōka Taneda 種田 山頭火 pen name of Taneda Shōichi 種田 正一 (died 1940), author and haiku poet
 December 5 – Natalia Negru (died 1962), Romanian poet
 December 11 – Subramania Bharati (died 1921), Tamil writer, poet, journalist, Indian independence activist and social reformer
 December 27 – Mina Loy (died 1966), English artist, poet, Futurist, actor, Christian Scientist, designer of lamps and bohemian
 Also:
 C. Subrahamania Bharati (died 1921), Indian, Tamil-language poet also writing Indian poetry in English
 Wallace Gould (died 1940), American

Deaths
Birth years link to the corresponding "[year] in poetry" article:
 February 8 – Berthold Auerbach (born 1812), German-Jewish poet and novelist
 March 29 – Sibella Elizabeth Miles (born 1800), English poet, writer and schoolteacher
 April 10 – Dante Gabriel Rossetti 63, English poet, illustrator, painter and translator
 April 23 – William Brighty Rands (born 1823), English writer of nursery rhymes
 April 27 – Ralph Waldo Emerson, 78, American author, poet and philosopher
 March 24 – Henry Wadsworth Longfellow, 75, American poet
 June 3 – James Thomson, 48, British poet whose fame rests primarily upon the reputation of his long poem of 1874, The City of Dreadful Night
 June 30 – Charles J. Guiteau, (born 1841), American writer and lawyer, assassin of United States President James A. Garfield 
 August 1 – Henry Kendall (born 1839), Australian
 August 25 (August 13 O.S.) – Friedrich Reinhold Kreutzwald (born 1803), Estonian author and poet
 October 30 – William Forster (born 1818), Australian politician, Premier of New South Wales and poet
 Also:
 Charles R. Thatcher (born c. 1831), Australian

See also

 19th century in poetry
 19th century in literature
 List of years in poetry
 List of years in literature
 Victorian literature
 French literature of the 19th century
 Poetry

Notes

19th-century poetry
Poetry